Koudum-Molkwerum is a railway station located near Molkwerum and Koudum, Netherlands. The station was opened on 28 November 1885 and is on the Leeuwarden - Stavoren railway line. The train service is operated by Arriva. The station was closed between 15 May 1938 and 1 June 1940. The platform at this station is only 90 meters long and therefore the shortest of all train platforms in the country.

Train services

Bus services

See also
 List of railway stations in Friesland

References

External links
NS website 
Dutch Public Transport journey planner 

Railway stations in Friesland
Railway stations opened in 1885